Vescisa is a genus of moths in the family Noctuidae. The genus was erected by Francis Walker in 1864.

The Global Lepidoptera Names Index gives this name as a synonym of Eublemma Hübner, 1829.

Species
 Vescisa commoda Walker, 1864
 Vescisa crenulata Hampson, 1896
 Vescisa digona Hampson, 1910
 Vescisa pervadens Warren, 1914

References

Acontiinae